Siagonodon is a genus of snakes in the family Leptotyphlopidae. The genus contains four species, all of which were previously placed in the genus Leptotyphlops.

Species
The genus Siagonodon contains the following species.
Siagonodon acutirostris 
Siagonodon borrichianus  – Degerbol's blind snake
Siagonodon cupinensis  – Mato Grosso blind snake 
Siagonodon septemstriatus  – seven-striped blind snake

References

Further reading
Peters W (1881). "Einige herpetologische Mittheilungen: 1. Uebersicht der zu den Familien der Typhlopes und Stenostomi gehörigen Gattungen oder Untergattungen ". Sitzungs-Berichte der Gesellschaft Naturforschender Freunde zu Berlin 1881 (4): 69–71. (Siagonodon, new genus, p. 71). (in German).

External Links
 iNaturalist page

 
Snake genera
Taxa named by Wilhelm Peters